The VTB United Youth League is a basketball tournament that is contested between the youth teams of basketball clubs from the VTB United League. The league is sponsored by VTB Bank.

The reigning champion is Zenit M after defeating 68:71 after overtime CSKA Junior.

Formats
In the tournament, there are 11 teams that play in 4 rounds - paired matches at home and on the road. The 8 best teams on the basis of the regular season go to the Final Eight. The age of players performing in the Youth League must not be less than 15 and not older than 19 years on the date of the first match.

Current clubs

Finals

Statistics by club

See also
 Euroleague Basketball Next Generation Tournament
 Junior ABA League

Notes

External links
Official Site 

Youth
Basketball leagues in Russia
Youth basketball competitions
Sports leagues established in 2013
2013 establishments in Russia